Essequibo Islands-West Demerara (Region 3) is a region of Guyana.

Split in two by the Essequibo River, Venezuela claims the territory to the west of Essequibo river as part of Delta Amacuro state, what represents Essequibo Islands. Unlike West Demerara who is located east of Essequibo river, which means is out of the dispute.

It is bordered by the Atlantic Ocean to the north, the region of Demerara-Mahaica and Demerara River to the east, the region of Upper Demerara-Berbice to the south and the region of Pomeroon-Supenaam to the west. It contains villages such as Parika, Tuschen and Uitvlugt. It contains the three hundred and sixty five islands in the Essequibo river of which three of the largest islands can be found at the mouth of the Essequibo, these are Hogg Island, Wakenaam and Leguan.

Population
The Government of Guyana has administered three official censuses since the 1980 administrative reforms, in 1980, 1991 and 2002.  In 2002, the population of Essequibo Islands-West Demerara was recorded at 103,061 people. Official census records for the population of Essequibo Islands-West Demerara are as follows:

2012 : 107,416
2002 : 103,061
1991 : 95,975
1980 : 104,750

Communities
(including name variants):

 Ampa Bay (Post Ampa)
 Caledonia
 Cornelia Ida
 De Jonge Rachael
 De Willem
 Den Amstel (Den Amstel Village, Amstel)
 Fort Island
 Fredericksburg
 Goed Fortuin
 Hague Backdam (Hague Front/Jib, Hague)
 Harlem
 Hogg Island
 Hopetown
 Hubu
 La Parfaite Harmonie
 Leonora
 Louisiana
 Makouria
 McDoom Village (McDoom)
 Met-en-Meerzorg (Meten-Meer-Zorg)
 Melville
 Morasi
 Nismes
 Noitgedacht
 Parika
 Patentia
 Phoenix Town
 Ruimzight
 Santa Mission (Santa Aratak)
 Sarah
 Saxacalli (Saxakalli, Saxsacali)
 Schoonord (SchoonordSchoon Ord)
 Stanleytown
 Stewartville
 Tuschen
 Uitvlugt
 Vergenoegen
 Vreed-en-Hoop
 Vriesland
vive-la-force,Guyana
 Windsor Forest
 Zeeburg
 Zeelandia

Gallery

See also

References

 
Regions of Guyana